Sacred Heart Schools is a PK–8 independent Roman Catholic school in Chicago, Illinois, United States, that welcomes students of all faiths. It was established in 1876 in the city and today is part of a global network of Sacred Heart schools.

Athletics 
Sacred Heart Schools offers a variety of sports in the fall, winter, and spring seasons. There are around 42 teams that compete throughout the year. Students can participate in various skill levels of soccer, cross country, track, volleyball, softball, basketball and baseball.

The students play and compete against children from schools from the Chicago Archdiocese. Also offered is Biddy Basketball, a youth basketball program for students in grades K-3. It is an eight-week program.

The school's mascots are the Academy Wildcats and Hardey Falcons.

Notable alumni 
 Brad Thor, thriller novelist
 Alexi Giannoulias, financier and politician
 Neil Hartigan, Illinois Democrat, served as Illinois Attorney General, the 40th Lieutenant Governor and a judge of the Illinois Appellate Court
 Thomas Campbell, academic, educator and former politician

References

External links 
 

Private elementary schools in Chicago
Private middle schools in Chicago
Catholic elementary schools in Illinois
Catholic schools in Chicago
Sacred Heart schools in the United States
Educational institutions established in 1876
1876 establishments in Illinois